Triumph Records may refer to:

 Triumph Records (US), a United States based company
 Triumph Records (UK), a United Kingdom based company

See also
 List of record labels